George Silundika was a Zimbabwean politician.

Early life 
Tarcisius Marlan George Silundika born March 1929 in Plumtree, Bulilimamangwe District. His father was a businessman and a member of the Kalanga tribe of that area. George received his primary education at Empandeni mission school and then went to St Francis College, Marian Hill, Natal in 1945.

Political career 
In 1951 he enrolled at Fort Hare University in Eastern Cape province of South Africa, he was expelled the following year for political activism. In 1954 he obtained a place at the Pius XII University Roma in Basutholand (now Lesotho), he also became a research assistant at the University of Rhodesian and Nyasaland in the department of African Studies. He then entered in politic in 1959. Back home he began organizing protests and leading demonstrations in Highfield, Harare. He became an executive member of the ANC, NDP and ZAPU before they were banned. In 1963, he was sent to Lusaka to direct the first stages of the armed struggle and there he built and strengthened ZIPRA. He also sought the unification of ZANLA and ZIPRA as well as ZANU and ZAPU in order to promote greater unity of purpose and action.

Cde Silundika returned home after the Lancaster House Conference and was elected a ZAPU MP for Matebeleland South, and became a Minister. He was one of the three appointed PF ZAPU Ministers by Robert Mugabe alongside Joshua Nkomo and Joseph Msika. He suffered a stroke while he was working in office on April 9, 1981.

Cde Silundika "TG" as he was popularly known in political circles died when he suffered a stroke while working in his ministerial office. Cde Silundika was Minister of Roads, Road Traffic, Post and Telecommunications and a member of ZAPU's Central Committee at the time of death on April 9, 1981. He was buried at Heroes Acre in April 1981.

References

African National Congress politicians
ZANU–PF politicians
1929 births
1981 deaths